Motti Malka is the mayor of the southern Israeli city of Kiryat Malakhi. Malka is a member of the Mayors For Peace Network, an organization that aims to promote peace at a local, and civil society level across the world.

Malka was first elected in the 2003 municipal elections, beating the Likud incumbent by a comfortable margin. In the 2007 elections, he was re-elected on the Kadima list with 84% of the vote.

On 10 May 2012, Ynet news reported that Malka is a suspect in a rape in an apartment for a demonstration project. Malka denied the allegations and stated that sexual relations were held "consensually".

References

Living people
Jewish Israeli politicians
Kadima politicians
Mayors of places in Israel
People from Kiryat Malakhi
Year of birth missing (living people)